The Strand Theatre in Jennings, Louisiana, at 432 N. Main St., was built in 1939.  It was listed on the National Register of Historic Places in 1998.

It is a Moderne-style building designed by architects Favrot, Reed, and Fred.

It was the only theatre open in Jennings during most of 1939 to 1948.

References

Theatres in Louisiana
National Register of Historic Places in Jefferson Davis Parish, Louisiana
Moderne architecture in the United States
Buildings and structures completed in 1939